William Raymond James Bousen (13 January 1911 – 28 May 2002) was a member of the Queensland Legislative Assembly.

Biography
Bousen was born in Toowoomba, Queensland, the son of Sydney Herbert Bousen and his wife Annie Louisa (née Stayte). He was educated at Toowoomba North State School before attending the Toowoomba Technical College. He worked for the Queensland Railways all his life in a variety of jobs.

On 29 April 1933 he married Doris Evelyn Hooper and together had two daughters. He died at Coolum in May 2002.

Public life
Bousen, representing the Labor, was the member for Toowoomba West in the Queensland Legislative Assembly from 1969 until 1972. Toowoomba West was abolished and from 1972 until his defeat in 1974 he represented Toowoomba North.

References

Members of the Queensland Legislative Assembly
1911 births
2002 deaths
Australian Labor Party members of the Parliament of Queensland
20th-century Australian politicians